Undercover is the debut studio album of the Italian musician Tying Tiffany.<ref

name=discogs2></ref>

Track listing
 "Wake Up" - 3:15
 "Cat Killer Show" - 3:01
 "LCD Soundsystem Is Playing at My House" - 2:33
 "Last Weekend" - 1:03
 "Sugar Boy, Sugar Girl" - 1:59
 "I'm Not a Peach" - 2:42
 "I Wanna Be Your MP3" - 2:05
 "Telekoma" - 0:53
 "Honey Doll" - 3:56
 "Running Bastard" - 0:44
 "Black Neon" - 2:03
 "You Know Me" - 5:42
 "Cloud" - 1:35

References

Tying Tiffany albums
2005 debut albums